A Salvage Drum is an outer container used for shipping a leaking, damaged or non-compliant drum containing hazardous materials. 

Several designs are available.

Originally designed to be greater than, or equal to, the construction and performance specifics of an inner container, the Performance Oriented Packaging Standards (POPS) of the US Department of Transportation requirement was that the Salvage Drum be at least a 'Z' (Packing Group III) solids container. Convinced that this was not an acceptable test for a Salvage Drum, on January 1, 1998, the 'T' Salvage Drum (1A2T) became the UN recommended salvage packaging for international shipments. The US-DOT, per 49 CFR 173.3, also recognizes the 'T' Salvage Drum for shipments within the US. Unlike the original 49 CFR Salvage Drum requirement, the 'T' Salvage Drum is most commonly an  steel drum that, meets UN Model Regulations test requirement 6.1.5.1.11, which specifies that when filled with water, the drum can qualify for Packing Group II and be dropped  on its most critical orientation, and not leak. In addition, the drum must successfully pass a  Leakproofness Test. Both tests are very severe for an open-head steel container. This testing illustrates the extreme capabilities of the 'T' Salvage Drum when used for the safe recovery of hazardous materials in transportation.

See also
UN Recommendations on the Transport of Dangerous Goods
Drum (container)
Package testing

References

 Yam, K. L., "Encyclopedia of Packaging Technology", John Wiley & Sons, 2009, 
 Performance tests of selected plastic drums, National Research Council Canada, February 2005. TP 14396E, Transport Canada
 Drop tests of selected steel drums, InNOVAcorp, 2003. TP 14093E, Transport Canada

Drum, Salvage
Safety equipment